Døden på Oslo S is a Norwegian film, released in 1990. The title literally meaning The death at Oslo Central Station, it is set in Oslo in the late eighties. It is based on a book by Ingvar Ambjørnsen from the book series Pelle og Proffen.

Plot
The film is about the two teenage boys, Pelle and Proffen, that try to help Pelle's girlfriend, Lena, who has a drug problem. She is only 15 years old, and they initially meet at a snackbar in downtown Oslo. She has been abused by a social worker at a home for troubled teens. While they try to help Lena she runs away, they get beat up and watch people overdose at the central train station in Oslo.

The film deals with issues like drugs, troubled teens and their parents, and child pornography. It's also about Pelle and Proffen's families and their different backgrounds. Pelle's parents are former hippies and very liberal, but Proffen's parents are old and conservative.

Production
The scene where Lena is at Pelle's home for the first time and he offers her to spend the night together, was shot in one of the first day of filming. In the scene 16-year-old Helle Beck Figenschow is seen removing all her clothes, right in front of Håvard Bakke. Asked later if he had already seen a naked girl in his life, Bakke said: "Hehe, yes. But not many!"

References

External links
 
 En hyllest til det ustreite [an hommage to the unconventional], NRK

1990 films
1990s Norwegian-language films
1990 action films
Norwegian action films